Lukáš Ambros (born 5 June 2004) is a Czech professional footballer who plays as a midfielder for Bundesliga club VfL Wolfsburg.

Career
Ambros is a youth product of the Czech clubs Dolní Němčí, Slovácko, and Slavia Prague before moving to the youth academy of the German club Wolfsburg in the summer of 2020. He worked his way up their youth categories, eventually captaining their U18 side and signed his first professional contract with the club on 4 September 2021. He was promoted to their senior side in the winter of 2022. He made his professional debut with Wolfsburg as a late substitute in a 3–0 Bundesliga loss to RB Leipzig on 18 February 2023, becoming the youngest ever Czech player in the league.

International career
Ambros is a youth international for the Czech Republic, having captained the Czech Republic U18s.

References

External links
 Profile at the VfL Wolfsburg website
 
 Bundesliga profile
 Repre.Fotbal profile

2004 births
Living people
People from Uherské Hradiště District
Czech footballers
Czech Republic youth international footballers
Bundesliga players
VfL Wolfsburg players
Association football midfielders
Czech expatriate footballers
Czech expatriate sportspeople in Germany
Expatriate footballers in Germany